Klarinet is a town in the Greater city of eMalahleni (previously known as Witbank). The town lies within the Nkangala District Municipality in the Mpumalanga province of South Africa. It is governed by the eMalahleni Local Municipality (eMalahleni is a Nguni name which means "a place of coal"). The city was renamed because of the coal mines that are found in the area.

Klarinet lies on the highveld of Mpumalanga.

References

Populated places in the Emalahleni Local Municipality, Mpumalanga